Core Creek is the name of a bay in Carteret County, North Carolina. It is the estuary of the Adams Creek Canal, which leads from the Neuse River estuary to the estuary of the Newport River.

References

Bays of North Carolina